Sinntal is a municipality in the Main-Kinzig district, in Hesse, Germany. It has a population of around 8,800.

Geography

Location
Sinntal is located around 30 km south of Fulda in the Main-Kinzig district of Hesse.

The municipal territory lies at elevations between 220 and 585 m above NHN. It includes area in the Mittelgebirge Spessart and Rhön.

Sinntal is located right at the border between Hesse and Bavaria. It stretches across the valley of the Sinn river from which it takes its name.

Subdivisions
Sinntal consists of the following Ortsteile:
 Altengronau
 Breunings
 Jossa
 Mottgers
 Neuengronau
 Oberzell with Ziegelhütte
 Sannerz
 Schwarzenfels
 Sterbfritz (seat of the municipal administration)
 Weichersbach
 Weiperz
 Züntersbach

Neighbouring communities
Sinntal borders on (from the north, clockwise): Kalbach (Hesse), Motten, the unincorporated area , Bad Brückenau, Zeitlofs, the unincorporated area , Obersinn (all Bavaria), the unincorporated area Gutsbezirk Spessart (Hesse) and Schlüchtern (Hesse).

Governance
The mayor of Sinntal is Carsten Ullrich.

Infrastructure

Transport
Sinntal lies on the Hanover-Würzburg high-speed rail line. Germany's longest tunnel, the Landrücken Tunnel is located in the northern part of the municipal territory.

The closest motorway is the Bundesautobahn 7. The nearest interchange is "Bad Brückenau".

References

External links

  

Municipalities in Hesse
Main-Kinzig-Kreis
East Hesse